Waleran III may refer to:

 Waleran III, Duke of Limburg (1165–1226)
 Waleran III of Luxembourg, Count of Ligny (1355–1415)